Bernhard Eunom Philippi (September 19, 1811, in Charlottenburg – September 6, 1852) was a German naturalist, explorer and colonization agent for Chile. He played an important role in the Chilean colonization of the Strait of Magellan and the German colonization of Valdivia, Osorno and Llanquihue.

Biography
His father was Johann Wilhelm Eberhard Philippi and his mother Maria Anna Krumwiede. In 1818 the family moved to Switzerland, where Rudolph and his brother Bernhard entered the school of Johann Heinrich Pestalozzi. Their brother Federico Philippi studied natural sciences and languages. Bernhard Philippi continued his education at the Technical College of Berlin between 1822 and 1830. He did nautical studies on a fellowship at the port of Danzig from 1831 to 1835.

Philippi traveled to South America, where he settled in Ancud, Chile in 1838. From there he explored the south of the country. Establishing relations with civil authorities, he encouraged the idea of German colonization in Chile. On August 27, 1848, the Chile government appointed him as colonization agent and he went to Europe to recruit immigrants. In 1851 his brother, the paleontologist and zoologist Rodolfo Armando Philippi, settled in Santiago after an invitation from him. By 1852 Bernhard Philippi was appointed as governor of Magallanes Region.

See also
Benjamín Muñoz Gamero
German-Chilean
Carlos Anwandter
Vicente Pérez Rosales

References

Memoria chilena

1811 births
1852 deaths
People from Charlottenburg
Chilean politicians
Chilean diplomats
German emigrants to Chile
Explorers of Chile
Governors of Magallanes
Scientists from Berlin
Bernhard Eunom